Guangzong Temple, may refer to:

 Guangzong Temple (Mount Wutai), on Mount Wutai, in Wutai County, Shanxi, China
 Guangzong Temple (Inner Mongolia), in Alxa Left Banner, Inner Mongolia, China

Buddhist temple disambiguation pages